Peter Giger (born April 12, 1939 in Zurich) is a Swiss percussionist and bandleader, formerly of the band :de:Dzyan.

References

External links

Peter Giger Official website

1939 births
Swiss conductors (music)
Male conductors (music)
Duke Ellington Orchestra members
Living people
Swiss percussionists
20th-century Swiss musicians
20th-century conductors (music)
21st-century conductors (music)
Clarinet Contrast members